Marpod is a commune located in Sibiu County, Transylvania, Romania. It is composed of two villages, Ilimbav (Eulenbach; Illenbák) and Marpod.

The river Marpod flows through both Ilimbav and Marpod villages.

The first underground gas storage facility in Romania was built in 1958 at Ilimbav.

References

Communes in Sibiu County
Localities in Transylvania